Emamabad (also Romanized as Emāmābād; also known as Emāmābād-e Kūnāb, Gūnāb, Konāb, Koonab, and KunĀb) is a village in Qareh Chay Rural District, in the Central District of Saveh County, Markazi Province, Iran. At the 2006 census, its population was 356, in 77 families.

References 

Populated places in Saveh County